Nokia PureView is the branding of a combination of technologies used in cameras of Nokia-branded smartphones, and previously, in phones by Microsoft Mobile. PureView was first introduced with Nokia 808 PureView.

Hardware
PureView cameras have on-chip image processors that perform image scaling with oversampling, giving improved digital zoom, and reduced noise compared to a typical smartphone camera. Both are combined with xenon flash, a 1080p HD video camera, and high resolution Zeiss all-aspherical 1-group lenses. Unlike the Nokia 808, the Nokia Lumia 1020 — along with other Lumia PureView smartphone cameras — possess optical image stabilization, which became standard in Lumia PureView bundling. The Nokia 808 does, however, compensate with its own exclusive camera-complementing media features, such as Micro HDMI TV-out, and built-in video editing.

History
Following the acquisition of the Nokia Devices & Services division by Microsoft, the U.S. software company acquired the PureView name and trademark, but not the related imaging technology, which remained with Nokia, who, as a result, licensed it to Microsoft.

Since Microsoft's ownership, the technology has only been used in their late-2015 flagship Lumia 950.

In late August 2018, HMD Global reportedly acquired the ownership of the PureView trademark and related assets not under the Nokia ownership.

On 24 February 2019, HMD Global, the exclusive licensee of Nokia-branded phones, launched Nokia 9 PureView at the 2019 Mobile World Congress in Barcelona.

On 19 March 2020, HMD Global announced the Nokia 8.3 5G, it is said to feature a 64MP PureView Quad-Camera System with Carl Zeiss Optics.

On 2 September 2022, the Nokia X30 5G announced with PureView technology, but ZEISS lens is absent due to HMD Global ends partnership with Carl Zeiss AG. The X30 features 50 MP main sensor which is the same with Samsung Galaxy S22.

Reception
PureView cameras have enjoyed universal critical praise as being among the best smartphone cameras on the market. Furthermore, the brand's willingness to experiment and push boundaries in imaging technology have spawned prime examples, such as 41-megapixel Nokia 808 and Nokia Lumia 1020.

Models
 Nokia 808 PureView (Symbian Belle)
 Nokia Lumia 920 (Windows Phone 8)
 Nokia Lumia 925 (Windows Phone 8)
 Nokia Lumia 928 (Windows Phone 8)
 Nokia Lumia Icon (Windows Phone 8)
 Nokia Lumia McLaren (Windows Phone 8.1)
 Nokia Lumia 830 (Windows Phone 8.1)
 Nokia Lumia 930 (Windows Phone 8.1)
 Nokia Lumia 1020 (Windows Phone 8)
 Nokia Lumia 1520 (Windows Phone 8)
 Microsoft Lumia 950 (Windows 10 Mobile)
 Microsoft Lumia 950 XL (Windows 10 Mobile)
 Nokia 9 PureView (Android One based on Android Pie 9.0)
 Nokia 8.3 5G (Android One based on Android 10)
 Nokia X30 5G (Android 12)

See also
 Microsoft Lumia
 Lumia imaging apps

References

 
Microsoft hardware